Magic is the 11th CD released by the musical group Twins. It was released in January 2004 and contains 11 songs. It was named Magic to emphasise their new singing style and the theme of the album.

Track listing
"Liang Ge Hao" (兩個好)  
"Shi Duo Pi Li Pin Guo Cheng" (士多啤梨蘋果橙)   
"Yin Ge" (飲歌)       
"Qing Gong" (輕功)   
"Ling Si Hao Wan" (零四好玩)      
"Gimme 5"   
"Chen Yong Ren" (陳永仁)   
"Shuang Shi Qing Ren Jie" (雙失情人節)   
"Mi Yue" (蜜月)   
"Shi Jie Er Nu" (世界兒女)   
"Shuai Ge Wu Yong" (帥哥無用) (Putonghua version)

2004 albums
Twins (group) albums